Bettel v Yim (1978), 20 O.R. (2d) 617 is a Canadian tort case from Ontario. The Court established that an individual is liable for all harm that flows from his or her conduct even where the harm was not intended.

See also
 List of notable Canadian lower court cases

Canadian tort case law
1978 in Canadian case law
1978 in Ontario
Ontario case law
Personal injury